The Hispaniola racer or Hispaniolan brown racer (Haitiophis anomalus) is a snake that is endemic to the Caribbean island of Hispaniola (split between the Dominican Republic and Haiti). It is monotypic in the genus Haitiophis.

Description
At an average length of 2 meters (6.56 ft), H. anomalus is the largest colubrid snake in the Americas, and the longest snake species in the West Indies. True to its name, it is brown in coloration, with a pale yellow underbelly.

Behavior
When cornered, individuals may produce a hood and rear up, similar to many Old World cobras. The species may also strike; however, it is non-venomous.

Diet
H. anomalus has a varied diet. Frogs and lizards (particularly Anolis species) are the most common prey item; however, individuals have also been recorded to prey on  smooth-billed ani (Crotophaga ani), house mouse (Mus musculus) and native boas (Chilabothrus sp.). Pursuits of juvenile rhinoceros iguanas (Cyclura cornuta) and rats (Rattus sp.) have also been recorded. While hunting, it has been recorded to wait at the exit hole of iguana burrows.

Distribution and habitat
The historic range of H. anomalusis believed to be island-wide; however, its range has heavily contracted over time. The majority of the racer's range lies in the Dominican Republic, where it is found in the southwest of the country (in the arid areas surrounding Lake Enriquillo, Pedernales Province, and Isla Beata) as well as a relict population in Monte Cristi Province. In Haiti, the racer is only known to exist on Tortuga. 
The Hispaniola racer is primarily found in xeric open-thorn forest, as well as transitional areas into oases and river valleys.

Threats
Agricultural expansion, deforestation for charcoal production (especially in Haiti), and predation from invasive species, such as feral cats (Felis catus) and small Indian mongooses (Urva auropunctata) are all factors that have resulted in the range and population reduction of H. anomalus. Predation from the native red-tailed hawk (Buteo jamaicensis) is inferred, but has not been recorded.

References 

Dipsadinae
Monotypic snake genera
Reptiles described in 1863
Taxa named by Wilhelm Peters
Snakes of the Caribbean
Endemic fauna of Hispaniola
Reptiles of the Dominican Republic
Reptiles of Haiti